Ascochyta hordei is a plant pathogen that causes Ascochyta leaf spot on barley, which can also be caused by the related fungi Ascochyta graminea, Ascochyta sorghi and Ascochyta tritici. It is considered a minor disease.

See also
List of Ascochyta species

References

External links

Fungal plant pathogens and diseases
Barley diseases
hordei
Fungi described in 1930